Evžen Neustupný (31 October 1933 – 14 January 2021) was a Czech archaeologist, born in Prague and educated at the Charles University. He was a son of the archaeologist and museologist .

He was an author of numerous publications, e.g. Archaeological Method.

On 14 January 2021, Neustupný died at the age of 87.

References

1933 births
2021 deaths
Czech archaeologists
Charles University alumni
Scientists from Prague
Academic staff of the University of West Bohemia
20th-century archaeologists
21st-century archaeologists
Prehistorians